Rapala rhodopis is a butterfly in the family Lycaenidae. It was described by Lionel de Nicéville in 1889. It is found in the Indomalayan realm, where it has been recorded from Sumatra and Peninsular Malaysia.

References

External links
Rapala at Markku Savela's Lepidoptera and Some Other Life Forms

Rapala (butterfly)
Butterflies described in 1889